Novokalmanka is a rural locality (a selo) and the administrative center of Novokalmansky Selsoviet, Ust-Kalmansky District, Altai Krai, Russia. The population was 573 as of 2013. There are 11 streets.

Geography 
Novokalmanka is located 22 km south of Ust-Kalmanka (the district's administrative centre) by road. Novotroyenka is the nearest rural locality.

References 

Rural localities in Ust-Kalmansky District